Nephon I or Niphon of Cyzicus (? – after 1314) was the Ecumenical Patriarch of Constantinople from 1310 to 1314. From Veria, Greece. Nicephorus Gregoras claimed Nephon to be illiterate, a lover of luxury, and ill-suited for the position. Due to his willingness to compromise, during his time as patriarch the Arsenite Schism was healed within the Byzantine Church. Nephon abdicated the throne after four years.

References

13th-century births
14th-century deaths
People from Veria
14th-century patriarchs of Constantinople
Bishops of Cyzicus